John Moyes may refer to:

 John Moyes (cricketer) (born 1946), English cricketer
 John Moyes (bishop) (1884–1972), Australian Anglican bishop and author
 Johnny Moyes (1893–1963), Australian cricketer

See also
John Martin Moye